Kenneth Maurice Churchill (October 20, 1910 – October 4, 1980) was an American athlete. He competed in the men's javelin throw at the 1932 Summer Olympics.

References

External links
 

1910 births
1980 deaths
Athletes (track and field) at the 1932 Summer Olympics
American male javelin throwers
Olympic track and field athletes of the United States
People from Hollister, California
Track and field athletes from California